Eldar Aziz oghlu Azizov is the head of the Baku City Executive Power since November 15, 2018.

Biography 
He was born on 28 June 1957 in Baku to Aziz Azizov and Elmira Azizova. Maternally he is the great-grandson of Karim bey Mehmandarov and great-great-grandson of Bahman Mirza. He graduated with honors from the History Department of Azerbaijan State University named after Kirov in 1979. Starting from the same year, he held various responsible positions in the Central Committee of the Komsomol of Azerbaijan.

Since 1984, he worked as the first secretary of the Komsomol committee of 26 Baku Commissars district (now Sabail Raion, Baku), after 1987 - the first secretary of the Baku city committee. He was elected secretary of the Central Committee of the Komsomol of Azerbaijan in 1989 and after 1991, he worked as secretary of the Central Committee of the Azerbaijan Youth Union.

He was elected to Supreme Council of Azerbaijan (a predecessor to parliament) in 1990 from Nizami Raion. After 8 years, he was appointed head of the department of international relations at the Central Election Commission of the Republic of Azerbaijan in 1998 and then following year, the first deputy chairman of the Department of Foreign Relations and Investment Programs of the Baku City Executive Power. Thus starting a chain of successive appointments to various city and district mayoralties.

His first job as mayor was in Nizami Raion where he served from 2000 to 2003. In 2003 - 2011 Eldar Azizov has served as a head of the Executive Power of Ganja (the second largest city of Azerbaijan), in 2011-2015 was the head of the Executive Power of Sumgait (the third largest city of Azerbaijan) and finally 2015-2018 as a head of the Executive Power of Sabail district. He is currently mayor of Baku, succeeding long time mayor Hajibala Abutalybov.

He is a member of Azerbaijan Journalists Union and honorary member Azerbaijan Architects Union. He is also an author of "Difai" - a book dedicated to a secret Azerbaijani organization in 1900s, which was partly led by his great-grandfather Karim bey Mehmandarov. He authored at least 200 articles in various newspapers.

Controversies 
He has been accused of culling the stray dogs of Baku by International Organization for Animal Protection. He was known for ordering huge cakes in honor of birthday of Ilham Aliyev.

Awards 
 Order of the Badge of Honour (Azerbaijan SSR, 1985)
 For service to the Fatherland Order, 2nd degree (22.06.2017)

References 

Baku State University alumni
New Azerbaijan Party politicians
Mayors of places in Azerbaijan
Politicians from Ganja, Azerbaijan
People from Sumgait
Mayors of Baku
1957 births
Living people